Valerie Muriel Jellay (born Valerie Jelly; September 1927 – 6 May 2017) was an Australian vaudevillian, actress, soubrette, dancer, author and TV personality. At the time of her death, she was the widow of fellow Australian vaudevillian, actor and comedian Maurie Fields; together they were in general considered to be a duo act in the entertainment industry. She was the mother of comedian and actor Marty Fields. 

Her early career had been in vaudeville and on stage before becoming a staple on the small screen in 1957. She started performing at just four years old and was still performing in her 80s.

Biography
Jellay's life in show business began in vaudeville, working with the Tivoli circuit in Australia. Her career began with dance lessons in 1931. She later moved into comedy and drama in the different media of stage, radio, film and television.

She married Australian actor Maurie Fields in 1960 and was married until his death in 1995. They appeared together as comedy regulars on HSV 7's "Sunny Side Up", along with Hal Lashwood, Syd Heylen and Honest John Gilbert, then later as husband and wife in the television series The Flying Doctors. She was also a regular on Good Morning Australia with Bert Newton, reviewing the latest movies, and also appeared on Hey Hey It's Saturday with her son Marty.

She appeared in serial Prisoner in four different character roles most notably as landlady Mabel Morgan, and in Neighbours as Connie O'Rourke. She appeared in many guest roles in Australian soap operas.

Jellay died on 6 May 2017 after having slipped into a coma and being on life support arising from complications of pneumonia; she was 89.

Filmography

FILM

TELEVISION

Select appearances

Bibliography
 Jellay, V., Stagestruck: An Autobiography, Spectrum Publications, (Richmond), 1994. 
 Jellay, V., After You've Gone: My Life after Maurie Fields, Spectrum Publications, (Richmond), 1998. 
 Jellay, V., So You Want To Be in Showbusiness, JoJo Publishing, (Docklands), 2007.

References

External links

1927 births
2017 deaths
Australian television actresses
Actresses from Sydney
Deaths from pneumonia in New South Wales